The landing flare, also referred to as the round out, is a maneuver or stage during the landing of an aircraft.

The flare follows the final approach phase and precedes the touchdown and roll-out phases of landing. In the flare, the nose of the plane is raised, slowing the descent rate and therefore creating a softer touchdown, and the proper attitude is set for touchdown. In the case of tailwheel landing gear-equipped aircraft, the attitude is set for touchdown on the main (front) landing gear first. In the case of tricycle gear-equipped aircraft, the attitude is set for touchdown on the main (rear) landing gear. In the case of monowheel gear-equipped gliders, the flare consists only of leveling the aircraft.

During a helicopter landing, a flare is used for reducing both vertical and horizontal speed thus allowing a near zero-speed touchdown.

References

External links 
The Effect of Synthetic Vision Enhancements on Landing Flare Performance

Types of take-off and landing